The Skulpturenpark Artpark (Sculpture garden Artpark) is a sculpture garden in the city of Linz, Austria, where more than 20 artists had created their sculptures. The size of the garden is over 5.000 square meters.

Situation 

The Skulpturenpark Artpark is situated in the quarter 'Lenaupark', district Lustenau of Linz, on the roof of the shopping-center Lenaupark City. It is the only cultural institution of this part of the city. Lenaupark has 43.000 m2 project space and is so the largest district-project of urban renewal in Austria outside Vienna.

History and concept 
This project in Linz was launched by the artist Manfred Kielnhofer. The opening was in 2006 and since this time the park si expanding every year.

The quarter Lenaupark, which was a train station in former times, measures about 43.000 m2. 2004 the developing project for urban renewal starts. One year later the shopping-center "Lenaupark-City" opens. The visual artist Manfred Kielnhofer, who leaves nearby, has the idea to start a cultural project there as well. The constructor of the buildings in the quarter Lenaupark, Johann Brandstetter, is himself a collector and sponsor for arts. So he helps the young artists association around Kielnhofer.

In Skulpturenpark Artpark you can find sculptures from Jonathan Borofsky, dEmo (Eladio de Mora), Manfred Kielnhofer, Robert Mittringer, Arnold Pichler, Erwin Reiter, Martina Schettina, Manfred Schöller, Pinuccio Sciola and Gerhard Wünsche.

Sculptures  

 Carlos Anglberger: Five letters, 5 parts, concrete, 2006–2008
 Jonathan Borofsky:  Numbersn, concrete,  ca. 50x100x30 cm each.
 dEmo (Eladio de Mora), bears. Polyester.
 Willi Kern: Venus. Clay. 250 cm high. 2006.
 Manfred Kielnhofer, Wächter, gypsum and polyester ca. 200 cm high. 2007.
 Manfred Koutek, Slidable lattice grate, painted road barrier, ca. 80 x 300 cm. 2009.
 Christoph Luckeneder: Light cactuses.
 Robert Mittringer: No title, 120 x 300 x 30 cm
 Arnold Pichler: Spearhead 60x100x120 cm, Stainless steel and steel, 2007
 Martina Schettina, Cucumber and tomatoes. Readymade. fruit, acrylic basement, ca. 100 cm high. 2009
 Manfred Schöller: Lightarc -Nonarc 250 cm high, metal, 2007
 Der Steiner, love=hate (Zerobudgeting), concrete,
 Der Steiner: Kisses for me iron, 200 x 180 cm, 2007
 Erwin Reiter: Dancer, stainless steel, 140x140x220 cm
 Gerhard Wünsche: The Queen, concrete on basement, 60x60x280 cm, 2006

Gallery

Arrangements 

Once a year- on the first Wednesday in April - the new season of the sculpture garden is acclaimed. The new sculptures are presented.

The Skulpturenpark Artpark can be visited from April to October.

Publications 

Lit ges Magazin for Literatur and more
Austria Journal 
catalogue Skulpturenpark 2007 
 Dobusch F., Mayr J. (pblsh.): Linz - Stadt der Arbeit und Kultur. Linz: Gutenberg-Werbering (1997)(German)
 Stadtforschung Linz: CD-ROM Linz 2000. Fakten, Bilder, Grafiken. Linz (2000)(German)

References

External links 

 
 globe of integration and other photos

Contemporary art galleries in Austria
Sculpture gardens, trails and parks in Europe
Buildings and structures in Linz
Art museums and galleries in Austria
Tourist attractions in Linz
Art museums established in 2006
2006 establishments in Austria
21st-century architecture in Austria